Darko Šuškavčević (born 28 April 1974) is a Montenegrin retired football defender. Besides Montenegro, he has played in the Czech Republic and Greece.

Club career
Born in Titograd, he moved to the Czech Republic in 2000 to play for Slavia Prague, Slovácko and Sigma Olomouc.

Managerial career
Šuškavčević was replaced by Mladen Vukićević as manager of Zeta in April 2013. He received his UEFA-A coaching licence in May 2013. He later was assistant manager at Sigma Olomouc and followed manager Leoš Kalvoda as he took up the same position at Znojmo in February 2018. He was dismissed alongside manager František Šturma in May 2019.

References

External links
 Player profile 
 Player profile 

1974 births
Living people
Footballers from Podgorica
Association football midfielders
Yugoslav footballers
Serbia and Montenegro footballers
Montenegrin footballers
FK Budućnost Podgorica players
OFK Titograd players
FK Hajduk Kula players
FK Vojvodina players
SK Slavia Prague players
Panionios F.C. players
1. FC Slovácko players
SK Sigma Olomouc players
Yugoslav First League players
First League of Serbia and Montenegro players
Second League of Serbia and Montenegro players
Czech First League players
Serbia and Montenegro expatriate footballers
Expatriate footballers in the Czech Republic
Serbia and Montenegro expatriate sportspeople in the Czech Republic
Montenegrin expatriate footballers
Montenegrin expatriate sportspeople in the Czech Republic
Montenegrin football managers
FK Zeta managers